The 2008–09 season will be Ferencvárosi TC's 3rd competitive season, 3rd consecutive season in the Nemzeti Bajnokság II and 109th year in existence as a football club.

Squad

Transfers

Summer

In:

Out:

Source:

Winter

In:

Out:

Source:

Competitions

Overview

Nemzeti Bajnokság II

League table

Results summary

Results by round

Matches

Hungarian Cup

League Cup

Group D

Matches

Statistics

Appearances and goals
Last updated on 13 June 2009.

|-
|colspan="14"|Youth players:

|-
|colspan="14"|Out to loan:

|-
|colspan="14"|Players no longer at the club:

|}

Top scorers
Includes all competitive matches. The list is sorted by shirt number when total goals are equal.
Last updated on 13 June 2009

Disciplinary record
Includes all competitive matches. Players with 1 card or more included only.

Last updated on 13 June 2009

Clean sheets
Last updated on 13 June 2009

References

External links
 Official Website
 UEFA
 fixtures and results

2008-09
Hungarian football clubs 2008–09 season